Vinogradsky is an impact crater in the Eridania quadrangle of Mars, located at 56.5°S latitude and 216.2°W longitude. It measures  in diameter and was named after Sergei Winogradsky. The name was approved in 1973, by the International Astronomical Union (IAU) Working Group for Planetary System Nomenclature.

See also 
 Climate of Mars
 Geology of Mars
 Impact crater
 Impact event
 List of craters on Mars
 Ore resources on Mars
 Planetary nomenclature

References 

Eridania quadrangle
Impact craters on Mars